A referendum on judicial reform was held in Botswana on 3 November 2001, having been originally scheduled for 6 October, but later postponed. The referendum asked eight separate questions about judges and courts, all of which were approved, seven by a margin of over 70%. Voter turnout for the referendum was just 4.9%, with 22,600 votes from a total of 460,252 registered voters. The postponement of the referendum by the government, a legal challenge by the Tswana nationalist group Pitso Ya Batswana, and a call by the group for a boycott were all suggested as reasons for the low turnout. Pitso Ya Batswana claimed that the referendum was an attempt by the BaKalanga ethnic group, who are over-represented in the judicial system, to increase their hold over it.

Question I
The first question was regarding qualification of candidates to be appointed judges on the High Court:

The proposal was passed with a 74.2% approval.

Question II
The second question was regarding qualification of candidates to be appointed judges on the Court of Appeal:

The proposal was passed with a 74.81% approval.

Question III
The third question was regarding a change in the designation of High Court judges:

The proposal was passed with a 76.74% approval.

Question IV
The fourth question was regarding raising the retirement age of High Court and Court of Appeal judges:

The proposal was passed, although with only a 53.93% approval, far lower than any of the other questions.

Question V
The fifth question was regarding the nomination of members of the Judicial Service Commission:

The proposal was passed with a 72.45% approval.

Question VI
The sixth question was regarding the Judicial Service Commission:

The proposal was passed with a 72.68% approval.

Question VII
The seventh question was regarding the Industrial Court:

The proposal was passed with a 74.5% approval.

Question VIII
The eighth and last question was regarding the Chief Justice:

The proposal was passed with a 76.68% approval, the highest of all the proposals.

References

Botswana judicial reform referendum
Judicial reform referendum
2001
Reform in Botswana
Botswana judicial reform referendum